Ink Master: Master vs. Apprentice is the sixth season of the tattoo reality competition series Ink Master that premiered on Spike on June 23 and concluded on October 13, 2015 with a total of 16 episodes. The show is hosted and judged by Jane's Addiction guitarist Dave Navarro, with accomplished tattoo artists Chris Núñez and Oliver Peck serving as series regular judges. The winner will receive a $100,000 prize, a feature in Inked Magazine, a Dodge Challenger and the title of Ink Master.

The premise of this season was featuring mentors and their apprentices as they compete against each other in an elimination-style competition.

This season saw the return of season three contestant Craig Foster, who originally finished the competition in 8th place.

The winner of the sixth season of Ink Master was Dave Kruseman, with Chris Blinston being the runner-up.

Judging and ranking

Judging Panel
The judging panel is responsible for passing judgement on each artist. They collaborate and use information from their own perception, the audience vote, human canvas vote, and the winner's worst vote to determine who should be sent home. Weight of decisions is set by the terms of the challenge skill.

Audience Voting
Audience voting is done through Facebook and Twitter, and was introduced in season 2. The audience vote was used in the finale episode to guarantee one of the finalists a spot in the top two.

Human Canvas Jury
After the tattoos are completed, the canvases for the challenge gather and vote on the best and worst of that day's tattoos. While the primary judges have the final say, the weight of the canvas vote does affect the judging panels final decision.

Jury of Peers
In episode two, the eight winners of the Head-to-Head challenge had to form a Jury of Peers to pick two artists to put up for elimination. These artists (including one artist picked from the Human Canvas Jury) had to participate in a Face-Off challenge to determine who would stay in the competition.

Contestants
Names, experience, and cities stated are at time of filming.

Master and Apprentices

Contestant progress
 Indicates the contestant was a Master.
 Indicates the contestant was an Apprentice.

  The contestant won Ink Master.
 The contestant was the runner-up.
 The contestant finished third in the competition.
 The contestant advanced to the finale.
 The contestant won Best Tattoo of the Day.
 The contestant won the Tattoo Marathon.
 The contestant won their Head-to-Head challenge.
 The contestant was among the top.
 The contestant received positive critiques.
 The contestant received negative critiques.
 The contestant was in the bottom.
 The contestant was in the bottom and voted Worst Tattoo of the Day by the Human Canvas Jury.
 The contestant was eliminated from the competition.
 The contestant was voted Worst Tattoo of the Day and was eliminated from the competition.
 The contestant returned as a guest for that episode.

Episodes
<onlyinclude><onlyinclude>

References

External links
 
 
 

2015 American television seasons
Ink Master